Self-publishing is the publication of media by its author at their own cost, without the involvement of a publisher. The term usually refers to written media, such as books and magazines, either as an ebook or as a physical copy using print on demand technology. It may also apply to albums, pamphlets, brochures, games, video content, artwork, and zines. Web fiction is also a major medium for self-publishing.

Definitions 

Although self-publishing is not a new phenomenon, dating back to the 18th century, it has transformed during the internet age with new technologies and services providing increasing alternatives to traditional publishing, becoming a $1 billion market.   However, with the increased ease of publishing and the range of services available, confusion has arisen as to what constitutes self-publishing.  In 2022, the Society of Authors and the Writers Guild of Great Britain produced a free downloadable guide to the various distinct types of publishing currently available.

Self publishing vs. Hybrid Publishing and Vanity Publishing 
In self publishing, authors publish their own book.  It is possible for an author to single-handedly carry out the whole process.  However increasingly, authors are recognizing that to compete effectively, they need to produce a high quality product, and they are engaging professionals for specific services as needed (such as editors or cover designers). A growing number of companies offer a one-stop shop where an author can source a whole range of services required to self-publish a book (sometimes called "Assisted Self-publishing Providers" or "Self-publishing Service Providers"). 

This should not be confused with 

 hybrid publishing, (where the publisher and author collaborate and share costs and risks. In return, the author may be required to surrender some control and/or rights in return for the publisher's financial and other contribution) OR
 vanity publishing, (where the author pays for the cost of all services, but also signs a restrictive contract which usually involves surrendering significant rights).

It has been suggested that the best test for whether a company offers "Assisted Self-publishing Services" or "Hybrid/vanity publishing" is to apply a variant of "Yog's Law", which states the following:

 Yog’s Law: Money flows toward the writer.
 Self-Publishing Corollary to Yog’s Law: While in the process of self-publishing, money and rights are controlled by the writer.

Therefore if a company offers services to the author without claiming any rights, and allows the author to control the entire process, they are assisting the author to self-publish. Whereas if the company takes some rights, and/or takes control of artistic decisions, they are a hybrid publisher or a vanity publisher, depending on the degree of involvement.

History

Early examples

Historically, some authors have chosen to self-publish. Successful examples are John Locke, Jane Austen, Emily Dickinson, Nathaniel Hawthorne, Martin Luther, Marcel Proust, Derek Walcott, and Walt Whitman. In 1759, British satirist Laurence Sterne's self-published the first two volumes of Tristram Shandy. In 1908, Ezra Pound sold A Lume Spento for six pence each. Franklin Hiram King's book Farmers of Forty Centuries was self-published in 1911, and was subsequently published commercially. In 1931, Irma S. Rombauer, the author of The Joy of Cooking paid a local printing company to print 3000 copies; the Bobbs-Merrill Company acquired the rights, and since then the book has sold over 18 million copies. In 1941, writer Virginia Woolf chose to self-publish her final novel Between the Acts on her Hogarth Press, in effect starting her own press.

Stigma

Traditional publishers are extremely selective in what they publish, and reject most of the manuscripts submitted to them. In spite of that rigorous selection, they then assign an editor to polish the work even further, a proof-reader to check for errors and a designer to produce the cover.   With no support, a self-publishing author is very unlikely to produce a book to that professional standard, unless they are astonishingly talented.  For that reason, self-published books have garnered a deserved reputation for being of lesser quality than mainstream books.  

Before the advent of the internet and POD (Print on Demand), most self-publishing authors had to resort to a vanity press, which was very costly and acted as a barrier to publication.  Now, ebooks can be published at virtually no cost and the market has been flooded with poorly produced books.  Some estimate that as much as 70% of published ebooks are so bad, they are unreadable.

However, some self-published authors are now taking a professional approach, using services like critique groups, beta readers, professional editors and designers to polish their work to a professional standard equivalent to traditional publishing. Such authors are achieving success equivalent to traditionally published writers, lending respectability to self-publishing.

Self-publishing is also common among editors of academic journals. The study showed that a quarter of them publish 10% of their own articles in the same journals they edit (which is problematic for ethical reasons).

Technological changes

A huge impetus to self-publishing has been rapid advances in technology.  Print-On-Demand (or POD) technology, which became available in the mid-1990s, makes it possible for a book to be printed after an order has been placed, so there are no costs for storing inventory.   Further, the Internet provides access to global distribution channels via online retailers, so a self-published book can be instantly available to book buyers worldwide. Advances in e-book readers and tablet computers have improved readability, making ebooks more popular. 

Amazon's introduction of the Kindle and its self-publishing platform, Kindle Direct Publishing or KDP, in 2007 has been described as a tipping point in self-publishing, which "opened the floodgates" for self-publishing authors. 

The Espresso Book Machine (a POD device) was first demonstrated at the New York Public Library in 2007. This machine prints, collates, covers, and binds a single book. It is in libraries and bookstores throughout the world, and it can make copies of out-of-print editions. Small bookstores sometimes use it to compete with large bookstore chains. It works by taking two pdf files, one for the text and one for the cover, and then prints an entire paperback book in a matter of minutes, which then drops down a chute.

The Library Journal and Biblioboard worked together to create a self-publishing platform called Self-e in which authors submitted books online which were made available to readers. These books are reviewed by Library Journal, and the best ones are published nationwide; authors do not make money this way but it serves as a marketing tool.

Advantages of self-publishing 
 Speed.  In traditional publishing, an author must first find an agent, then the agent must find a publisher, then it may take a year or more for the book to go through editing and be allocated a 'slot' in the publisher's calendar.   With self-publishing, it is possible to release a book within a few weeks after it is finished. 
 No start-up costs. It costs nothing to upload a book to most publishing platforms, and print copies do not have to be paid for until a customer orders. 
 Artistic control.  A traditional publisher may demand changes to meet market demands. 
 Control on pricing. The author decides the price and can change at any point of time. 
 A greater share of royalties. Self-published authors may earn four to five times more per unit than if an author works with a traditional publisher, sometimes 70 percent of the sale price.
 Pitch books straight to the readers. There is no intermediary censoring what might be shown to the public. The route to readers is more direct.

Disadvantages of self-publishing 
Stigma. Self-published books still have to combat prejudice due to the lack of gatekeepers to ensure quality.
 No physical presence. Traditional publishers distribute their books to high street bookstores on a sale-or-return basis, which is unaffordable for a self-published author, and libraries routinely order from the publisher's catalogues. 
 No advance. Traditional publishers will usually pay an advance, so the author receives some payment for the book even if it is unsuccessful.
 No free support. Traditional publishers pay all the costs associated with producing the book, and will provide an editor and cover designer at their expense.   
 Cost. The obvious corollary of the above is that the self-published author must pay all their own expenses. Though it is possible to publish a book free of charge, marketing and promotion are expensive.
 Marketing and promotion are time-consuming and costly.   Marketing is a task that many authors are not skilled at. UK author Rachel Abbott was working "14-hour days" promoting her book Only the Innocent; while she eventually made it to the UK Kindle bestseller chart, she still had difficulty getting the publishing world to take her book seriously. Another writer, Ros Barber, thinks self-publishing is a "terrible idea for serious novelists" since the requirements of marketing and promoting a book will prevent one from writing, and he continues to recommend the traditional approach. 
 Plagiarism. It is relatively easy to download the text of an ebook and republish it with minor changes under a different title.

Publishing platforms 
In order to be purchased by a customer, the completed book must be hosted on a publishing platform.  Amazon's Kindle is the largest of these but there are others.

Kindle Direct Publishing 

Kindle Direct Publishing or KDP is Amazon's e-book publishing unit (see main article)

IngramSpark 

IngramSpark lets authors publish digital, hardback and paperback editions of their books. It distributes books to most online bookstores. Bricks-and-mortar stores can also order books from IngramSpark at wholesale prices for sale in their own venues. It is run by Ingram Content Group.

Apple 
Apple sells books via its App Store which is a digital distribution platform for its mobile apps on its iOS operating system. Apps can be downloaded to its devices such as the iPhone, the iPod Touch handheld computer, and the iPad. Apple pays authors 70 percent of its proceeds at its Apple iBookstore where it sells iBooks.

Smashwords 
Smashwords is a California-based company founded by Mark Coker which allows authors and independent publishers to upload their manuscripts electronically to the Smashwords service, which then converts them into multiple e-book formats which can be read on various devices.

Barnes and Noble 
Barnes & Noble pays 65 percent of the list price of e-books purchased through its online store called Pubit.

Kobo 
Kobo is a Canadian company which sells e-books, audiobooks, e-readers and tablet computers which originated as a cloud e-reading service.

Scribd 
Scribd is an open publishing platform which features a digital library, an e-book and audiobook subscription service.

Lulu 
Lulu is an online print-on-demand, self-publishing and distribution platform.

 GmbH BoD (2001), (since 1997 as Libri GmbH), is the "original" in self-publishing.

Web fiction
A major development in this century has been the growth of web fiction. A common type is the web serial. Unlike most modern novels, web fiction novels are frequently published in parts over time. Web fiction is especially popular in China, with revenues topping US$2.5 billion, as well as in South Korea. Online literature in China plays a much more important role than in the United States and the rest of the world. Most books are available online, where the most popular novels find millions of readers. They cost an average of 2 CNY, or roughly a tenth of the average price of a printed book. Shanda Literature Ltd. is an online publishing company that claims to publish 8,000 Chinese literary works daily. Joara is S. Korea's largest web novel platform with 1.1 million members, 140,000 writers, an average of 2,400 serials per day and 420,000 works. Joara's users have almost the same gender ratio, and both fantasy and romance genres are popular.

Self-published bestsellers 

While most self-published books do not make much money, there are self-published authors who have achieved sucess, particularly in the early years of online self-publishing. The number of authors who had sold more than one million e-books on Amazon from 2011 to 2016 was 40, according to one estimate.

 Fifty Shades of Grey by E.L. James was originally published online as Twilight fan-fiction before the author decided to self-publish it as an e-book and print on demand.
 The science fiction novel The Martian, by Andy Weir, was originally released as chapters on his personal blog, and then self-published as an eBook in 2011. The rights were purchased by Crown Publishing which re-released it in 2014; the novel went on to become a bestseller and then a major motion picture starring Matt Damon.
 Blogger Alan Sepinwall's self-published book The Revolution Was Televised became an instant hit, winning a prominent review within two weeks of publication by critic Michiko Kakutani in The New York Times. Sepinwall hired an editor and spent roughly $2,500 on services to get his book ready for publication.
 Minnesota social worker Amanda Hocking uploaded several books in 2010 and sold a few dozen copies. She published several more manuscripts and within a few months was making enough money to quit her daytime job. She later won a deal with Macmillan publishers, and went to being a millionaire in a year. She sold her series to St. Martin's Press in 2011 for two million dollars.
 Swedish author Carl-Johan Forssen Ehrlin wrote a book in 2010 which helped get children to go to sleep; his The Rabbit Who Wants to Fall Asleep title featured amateurish illustrations with "clunky prose" and a monotonous storyline, but parents bought it for the catchy subtitle of "A new way of getting children to sleep". He released it on CreateSpace and it became a bestseller.
 Erotic romance author Meredith Wild sold 1.4 million digital and print copies of her books, and founded her own publishing company called Waterhouse Press; she founded the firm in part because she felt that her novels were "not being taken seriously" as an indie author. An advantage of having her own imprint is that it is easier to get books into chainstores and big-box retailers.

 The breakout hit Wool by Hugh Howey was self-published originally and garnered more than a million dollars in royalty monies, and has generated over 5000 Amazon reviews.

 James Altucher's Choose Yourself (2013) sold 44,294 copies in its first month, debuted at No. 1 on Amazon's top non-fiction list, and was a Wall Street Journal bestseller.
 Victoria Knowles achieved notoriety in July 2014 when her self-published book The PA reached the number one spot in the iTunes chart for paid books.
 Matthew Reilly's self-published Contest, the first of his action-thriller novels, in 1996.

See also

 Alternative media
 Author mill
 Dōjin
 Independent music
 List of self-publishing companies
 Samizdat
 Self Publish, Be Happy
 :Category:Self-published books
 Small press
 Predatory open access publishing
 Vanity publishing
 Web fiction

References

 
Publishing